This is a list of the members of the Australian House of Representatives in the ninth Australian Parliament, which was elected at the 1922 election on 16 December 1922. The incumbent Nationalist Party of Australia led by Prime Minister of Australia Billy Hughes lost its majority. However the opposition Australian Labor Party led by Matthew Charlton did not take office as the Nationalists sought a coalition with the Country Party led by Earle Page, however the Country Party made Hughes's resignation the price for joining. Hughes was replaced by Stanley Bruce.

Notes

References

Members of Australian parliaments by term
20th-century Australian politicians